Are We Experimental? is an album by Acid Mothers Temple & The Melting Paraiso U.F.O., released in 2009 by Prophase Music.

Track listing

Vinyl edition

Personnel 

 Tsuyama Atsushi - monster bass, voice, acoustic guitar, ukulele, flute, soprano recorder, cosmic joker
 Higashi Hiroshi - synthesizer, dancin'king
 Shimura Koji - drums, Latino cool
 Kawabata Makoto - electric guitar, guitar synthesizer, organ, sitar, electronics, tape, speed guru

Technical personnel 

 Production - Kawabata Makoto
 Mastering - Yoshida Tatsuya
 Artwork - Kawabata Makoto

References

External links
 Acid Mothers Temple at Prophase Music

2009 albums
Acid Mothers Temple albums
Acid rock albums